Scott Coleman Patridge (born 31 August 1965) is a former professional tennis player from the United States.

Biography

Early life & college
Scott Patridge was born in Newport Beach, California, the second son of Joe and Ginny. He went to Saratoga High School. While at the University of San Diego (USD) he played collegiate tennis and formed a strong doubles partnership with David Stewart. The pair won 48 matches from 1986 to 1988, which set a USD record. He turned professional after graduating with a business degree.

Professional tour
In 1991 and 1992 he competed on the ATP Tour as a doubles specialist. His best performance was a semi-final appearance at Itaparica with Canadian Martin Laurendeau in 1990. He played in the main draw of all four Grand Slam tournaments in 1991, all with different partners. At the 1991 Wimbledon Championships he and partner Joey Rive made the second round. As a singles player he made it to 200 in the world, through his participation in Challenger tournaments. He won three doubles titles on the Challenger circuit.

Challenger titles

Doubles: (3)

References

External links
 
 

1965 births
Living people
American male tennis players
San Diego Toreros men's tennis players
Tennis people from California
Sportspeople from Newport Beach, California